Goa Cricket Association Stadium is a cricket stadium, proposed to be built in Dhargal, Goa. The stadium will be the home ground for Goa Cricket Association. The project is currently suspended due to various problems including but was obstructed by the corruption and financial troubles. Goa is the only state association that does not own its own ground.

The ground will be established in 1.30 lakh square metres with all facilities like practice stadium, indoor practice area etc. The ground will have floodlight so that stadium can host day-night matches with capacity of 45,000 persons.

References

 
Cricket grounds in Goa
Proposed sports venues in India
Proposed stadiums
Stadiums under construction